Historia kina w Popielawach is a Polish historical film. It was released in 1998.

Cast 

 Krzysztof Majchrzak − Józef Andryszek Piąty
 Bartosz Opania − Józef Andryszek Pierwszy
 Grażyna Błęcka-Kolska − Chanutka Piąta
 Michał Jasiński − Józef Andryszek Szósty (Szóstek)
 Tomasz Krysiak − Staszek Szewczyk
 Andrzej Jurczak 
 Joanna Orleańska − Chanutka I
 Izabella Bukowska − Jagoda

References

External links
 

1998 films
Polish historical films
1990s Polish-language films
Films directed by Jan Jakub Kolski
1990s historical films